Ontario Lottery and Gaming Corporation, known for corporate branding purposes simply as OLG since 2006, is a Crown corporation owned by the Government of Ontario, Canada. It is responsible for the province's lotteries, charity and Aboriginal casinos, commercial casinos, and slot machines at horse-racing tracks. It was created in April 2000 when the Ontario Lottery Corporation (OLC) was merged with the Ontario Casino Corporation (OCC), established in 1994. Prior to 2006, the combined entity was known in short form as the OLGC (or SLJO in French). OLG employs over 8,000 individuals throughout Ontario; 1,400 in Sault Ste Marie and the GTA offices. There are approximately 9,800 retailers operating more than 10,000 lottery terminals across the province.

OLG's prize centre is located in Toronto, while the corporation's primary headquarters is located in Sault Ste. Marie. Whereas OLG is responsible for and operates a variety of gaming services, the Alcohol and Gaming Commission of Ontario (AGCO) regulates casino gaming. OLG reports through its board of directors to the Minister of Finance. From 2003 to 2007, it was under the Ministry of Public Infrastructure Renewal.

OLG operates a self-exclusion program for people with gambling addictions, although this program has been controversial.

History 

The Ontario Lottery Corporation was created in February 1975 under the Ontario Lottery Corporation Act, 1975 (repealed in 1999 and replaced with the current Ontario Lottery and Gaming Corporation Act). Wintario was the first lottery game offered by the fledgling OLC on April 3, 1975, and the first drawing took place on May 15, 1975.

Divisions 
OLG has five business divisions:

Lottery products 

OLG operates nine draw-style lottery games through retailers across the province.

Jackpot draws 
 Daily Grand (national)
 Lotto 6/49 (national)
 Lotto Max (national)
 Ontario 49
 Lottario

Daily draws 
 Pick 2
 Pick 3
 Pick 4
 Daily Keno
 Poker Lotto
 Mega Dice Lotto
 Wheel of Fortune Lotto

Sports games 
 Pro-Line
 Pro-Line+
 Pro-Picks
 Point-Spread

Lotto 6/49, Lotto Max and Daily Grand are operated across Canada by the Interprovincial Lottery Corporation. The corporation also offers instant scratch games under the brand Instant Games, and sports games under the brands Pro-Line, Point-Spread and Pro-Picks.

Lotto Advance 
OLG used to offer a subscription-based lottery service called LOTTO ADVANCE for Lotto 6/49. This service is now discontinued since September 7, 2013.

Casinos 

OLG owns and manages casinos.  Most of these which have private operators, notably Great Canadian Gaming and Gateway Casinos.
Shorelines Casino Belleville
Elements Casino Brantford
Cascades Casino Chatham
Great Blue Heron Casino
Casino Niagara
Niagara Fallsview Casino Resort
Shorelines Casino Peterborough
Pickering Casino Resort (under construction)
Starlight Casino Point Edward
Casino Rama
Gateway Casino Sault Ste. Marie
Shorelines Casino Thousand Islands
Gateway Casino Thunder Bay
Caesars Windsor
Wasaga Playtime Casino

Slots 
OLG operates slot machine facilities at racetracks across Ontario. They are located at:

Casino Ajax
Gateway Casino Clinton
Elements Casino Flamboro
Gateway Casino Innisfil
Elements Casino Grand River
Playtime Casino Hanover
Shorelines Slots Kawartha Downs
Gateway Casino London
Elements Casino Mohawk
Rideau Carleton Casino
Gateway Casino Sudbury
Casino Woodbine
Gateway Casino Woodstock

Slots at racetracks generated $300 million annually for the racetracks until 2012 when the program ended. However, threatened with the closure of numerous tracks, the Ontario government extended the plan while it determined its future direction in gaming facilities.

Bingo 
OLG operates a number of bingo centres throughout Ontario, including e-bingo.

Age requirements 

The minimum age to purchase OLG lottery tickets is 18; however, for patronizing casinos and/or parimutuel facilities in the province, it is 19.

Violators who sell OLG lottery tickets to anyone under the age of 18 can face significant fines under the legislation passed in 1997. In addition OLG reserves the right to suspend violators found to have sold OLG lottery tickets to anyone under the age of 18.

Collections 
Prizes under $1000 can be collected directly from a retailer that has a lottery terminal in store. This is subject to cash availability. People can collect bigger prizes by visiting an OLG Casino or Slot facility. This can be done by mailing the ticket to the OLG Prize Centre or by visiting the OLG Prize Centre in Toronto. When claiming the prize at the OLG Prize Centre, the prizewinner must have valid government identification as well as providing a signature. The ticket will be double-checked in case of fraud.

If the prize money is $5000 or more the terminal will freeze and OLG will be contacted. OLG will inform the winner directly of how to claim their prize.

If the prize money is $10,000 or more, the process of claiming your prize will involve an interview and an investigator validating the authority of the ticket. Once approved, there will be a picture taken of you with your cheque.

OLG publicizes all winners of $1,000 or more on their website.

There is a time period of exactly one year from the draw date to claim Ontario lottery games.

Controversies

Retailer fraud 
On October 25, 2006, the CBC program The Fifth Estate aired an investigative report on lottery retailers winning major prizes, focusing on the ordeal of 82-year-old Bob Edmonds. His $250,000 winning Encore ticket was stolen by a convenience store clerk when he went to have his ticket checked in 2001. For the next four years, OLG ignored Edmonds' inquiries after the clerk and her husband were falsely named the rightful winners. Later, when the couple was arrested for fraud, OLG refused to return his winnings, maintaining that it wasn't their responsibility that they had been tricked; in 2004, a judge disagreed and forced OLG to give Edmonds his money. They did so, on the condition that Edmonds sign a confidentiality agreement, so that he would never tell the press about certain details of the ordeal. Also, The Fifth Estate uncovered internal OLG memos where several employees admitted they believed Edmonds' story. Immediately following the broadcast, Edmonds received a call from OLG's president, Duncan Brown, who apologized and claimed he was ashamed about how his staff treated Edmonds. OLG later released Edmonds from the confidentiality agreement.

In another case, Toronto variety store owner Hafiz Malik had defrauded four school board employees out of their $5.7 million prize. He was arrested after the original ticket owners filed a complaint with the police. The OPP seized or froze over $5-million of Malik's assets, including bank accounts, three cars, and a home in Mississauga. OLG has since awarded the rightful winners the prize plus interest.

The report by The Fifth Estate added that over 200 lottery retailers in Ontario have won major prizes from 1999 to 2006. A statistician featured in the report, Jeff Rosenthal,  calculated that the chance that this would occur purely out of luck is one in a "trillion trillion trillion trillion" (or quindecillion). OLG did have a policy on insider wins, but it was rarely enforced during that period. Provincial ombudsman André Marin released a report stating that Ontario store owners and their families claimed about $100 million in lottery wins between 1999 and 2006, with tens of millions of fraudulent claims being ignored by the OLGC.

OLG has since mandated new security measures to protect lottery customers, notably with customer-facing displays when tickets are checked, as well as special music played with a winning ticket. As of January 28, 2008, lottery retailers are required to ensure that tickets are signed. There is a signature box shown on the front of all online lottery tickets.

Lottery ticket recalls

2007 Super Bingo recall 
In March 2007, OLG announced that it had recalled over 1,000,000 scratch and win tickets. The "Super Bingo" series of tickets were removed from retail stores after it was announced that a customer made the claim that he could visually tell which tickets were winners. It was the largest recall ever of a lottery ticket in Canada, and were prompted in part from greater media scrutiny regarding ongoing fraud investigations.

2009 Fruit Scratch recall 
In January 2009, OLG announced it has recalled over 1,000 scratch and win tickets.  The "Fruit Scratch" series of lottery tickets were removed from retail stores after it was discovered that dozens of lottery tickets were reportedly misprinted.  Up to 150 of the misprinted tickets were reportedly purchased at eight stores across Southern Ontario one week before the recall was issued. OLG has since reached an undisclosed settlement with a 27-year-old Thomas Noftall from Brampton, Ontario, who was mistakenly told that he may have won $135,000 on a misprinted lottery ticket.

Slot machine recall 
In February 2007, it was discovered that 87 slot machines at Provincially run casinos were displaying subliminal messages on slot machine screens to players. An image of a winning symbol combination was shown quickly before or during the simulated spinning of the slot machine reels. The manufacturer, Konami, provided a software update for the machines.

Aftermath 
In the wake of these controversies, the provincial government ordered Duncan Brown to be relieved of his position as OLG chief on 21 March 2007. This was not public knowledge until two days later, when Brown's dismissal took effect. David Caplan, Ontario's minister responsible for OLG, intended to announce this firing on 26 March following the release of a report on OLG's situation by the provincial ombudsman André Marin. Marin criticized the OLG for being more fixated on profits than the integrity of games after a disproportionate number of lottery retailers or their families claimed winning tickets.

Exclusion program inefficiency 
Casino clients who recognize that they have a gambling addiction can benefit from the self-exclusion program operated by the OLG. An investigation conducted by the CBC's The Fifth Estate (TV series) in late 2017 led to concerns as to whether the program is effective. According to a CBC article, "Gambling addicts ... said that while on the ... self-exclusion list, they entered OLG properties on a regular basis" in spite of the facial recognition technology in place at the casinos. As well, a CBC journalist who tested the system found that he was able to enter casinos and gamble on four distinct occasions, in spite of being registered and photographed for the program. Previous studies in other countries have also confirmed that self-exclusion programs can be difficult to enforce.

Some experts maintain that casinos, in general, arrange for self-exclusion programs as a public relations measure without actually helping those with problem gambling issues.  A campaign of this type "deflects attention away from problematic products and industries," according to Natasha Dow Schull, a cultural anthropologist at New York University and author of the book Addiction by Design. Other experts believe that self-enforcement is part of the problem gambler's own responsibility, as one aspect of any therapy program. "Without such acceptance of responsibility, much of the effectiveness of self-exclusion programs would be lost", as one explained.

As OLG literature confirms, the enforcement by a casino cannot be expected to be 100% foolproof. "If you attempt to re-enter a gaming facility in Ontario, your image may be captured by cameras and you may be automatically detected by security." An OLG spokesman provided this response when questioned by the CBC after the investigation of the self-enforcement program had been completed: "We provide supports to self-excluders by training our staff, by providing disincentives, by providing facial recognition, by providing our security officers to look for players. No one element is going to be foolproof because it is not designed to be foolproof".

Chair of the Board of Directors of the OLGC 
 Jim Warren 2021-present
 Gail Beggs 2021
 Peter Deeb 2019-2021
 George L. Cooke 2016–2019
 Phil Olsson 2013–2016
 Peter Wallace 2013 (interim)
 Paul Godfrey 2010–2013
 Michael Gough 2006–2009
 Timothy Reid 2004–2006
 Stanley Sadinsky 2003–2004
 Ron Barbaro 2000–2003 (and CEO)

President and CEO of the OLGC 
 Duncan Hannay 2020–present
 Stephen Rigby 2015–2020
 Rod Phillips 2011–2014
 Tom Marinelli 2010–2011 (interim)
 Kelly McDougald 2007–2009
 Duncan Brown 2004–2007
 Brian Wood 2003–2004 (interim)

Chair and CEO of the OLC 
 Ron Barbaro 1998–2000
 Garth Manness 1995–1998
 Ian Nielsen-Jones 1988–1995
 D Norman Morris 1980–1988
 Harvey McCullough, QC, 1975–1977 – as chairman
 E. Marshall Pollock, QC, 1975–1980 – as founding Managing Director & CEO of OLC

References

External links 
Ontario Lottery and Gaming Corporation
Lottario lottery website

Government agencies established in 1975
Crown corporations of Ontario
Ontario government departments and agencies
Lotteries in Canada
Sault Ste. Marie, Ontario
Organizations based in Toronto